Kelhauri (Chachai) is a census town in Shahdol district in the Indian state of Madhya Pradesh.

Demographics
 India census, Kelhauri had a population of 9502. Males constitute 53% of the population and females 47%. Kelhauri has an average literacy rate of 70%, higher than the national average of 59.5%: male literacy is 78%, and female literacy is 61%. In Kelhauri, 13% of the population is under 6 years of age. now it is a part of Anuppur district.

References

Cities and towns in Shahdol district
Shahdol